Gary Wayne Jones (born November 11, 1960) is an American Major League Baseball coach and a former player and manager in minor League baseball.

Formerly, Jones was the third-base coach of the Chicago Cubs from 2014 to 2017 and the first-base coach of the Oakland Athletics in 1998. Most recently, he was the manager of the Lehigh Valley IronPigs, Triple-A International League affiliate of the Philadelphia Phillies (2018–2019, 2021).

Career
The Cubs originally signed Jones as a 21-year-old free agent infielder in 1982 out of the University of Arkansas. Jones played for seven years in the Cubs and Athletics farm systems, including two seasons with the Triple-A Tacoma Tigers, and batted .283 with nine home runs in 899 minor league games between 1982 and 1989.

After retiring as a player, he was a manager in the Oakland, Boston Red Sox, and San Diego Padres organizations. From 1990 to 1997, 1999–2001 and 2003–06, Jones led teams in the International League, Pacific Coast League, Southern League, Midwest League, and Arizona Fall League. He managed the Madison Muskies, Huntsville Stars, Edmonton Trappers, Pawtucket Red Sox, Fort Wayne Wizards and Mobile BayBears.

Jones led the Stars to the Southern League championship in 1994 and the Trappers to back-to-back Pacific Coast League championships in 1996 and 1997. He also won Manager-of-the-Year Awards in 1991 (Madison), 1994 (Huntsville), 1996 and 1997 (both with Edmonton). In his first season with Lehigh Valley, he led the 2018 IronPigs to an 84–56 win–loss record and the International League North Division championship, although his team was eliminated in the opening round of the Governors' Cup playoffs. Through 2018, his career mark as a minor league manager was 1,124–1,028 (.522).

Prior to his appointment to the 2014 coaching staff of then-Cub manager Rick Renteria, Jones spent seven years as the roving minor league infield instructor for the San Diego Padres, where Renteria had been a Major League coach. He was retained when Joe Maddon replaced Renteria as manager in October 2014 for the  season, and was the third-base coach for the 2016 Cubs' National League and World Series championship team.

In December 2021, Jones was hired to manage the Toledo Mud Hens, the Detroit Tigers Triple-A team. On January 27, 2022, Jones was named first base coach for the Tigers' major league team, replacing Kimera Bartee who died suddenly in late 2021.

References

External links

 MWLguide.com - minor league managerial record

1960 births
Living people
20th-century African-American sportspeople
21st-century African-American people
African-American baseball coaches
African-American baseball managers
African-American baseball players
Arizona Fall League
Arkansas Razorbacks baseball players
Chicago Cubs coaches
Detroit Tigers coaches
Geneva Cubs players
Huntsville Stars players
Lehigh Valley IronPigs managers
Lodi Crushers players
Major League Baseball first base coaches
Major League Baseball third base coaches
Oakland Athletics coaches
Pawtucket Red Sox managers
People from Longview, Texas
Pittsfield Cubs players
Quad Cities Cubs players
Tacoma Tigers players